Agricultural Ditch is a  long 2nd order tributary to Dirickson Creek, in Sussex County, Delaware.

Variant names
According to the Geographic Names Information System, it has also been known historically as:  
Carey Branch

Course
Agricultural Ditch rises on the McCray Branch divide about 0.25 miles northwest of Roxana in Sussex County, Delaware.  Agricultural Ditch then flows generally southeast to meet Dirickson Creek about 0.25 miles north of Fenwick West, Delaware.

Watershed
Agricultural Ditch drains  of area, receives about 44.7 in/year of precipitation, has a topographic wetness index of 721.07 and is about 7.3% forested.

See also
List of rivers of Delaware

References 

Rivers of Delaware